This is a list of Chinese football transfers for the 2018 season summer transfer window. It opened on 18 June 2018 and closed on 13 July 2018.

Super League

Beijing Renhe

In:

Out:

Beijing Sinobo Guoan

In:

Out:

Changchun Yatai

In:

Out:

Chongqing Dangdai Lifan

In:

Out:

Dalian Yifang

In:

Out:

Guangzhou Evergrande Taobao

In:

Out:

Guangzhou R&F

In:

Out:

Guizhou Hengfeng

In:

Out:

Hebei China Fortune

In:

Out:

Henan Jianye

In:

Out:

Jiangsu Suning

In:

Out:

Shandong Luneng Taishan

In:

Out:

Shanghai Greenland Shenhua

In:

Out:

Shanghai SIPG

In:

Out:

Tianjin Quanjian

In:

Out:

Tianjin TEDA

In:

Out:

League One

Beijing Enterprises Group

In:

Out:

Dalian Transcendence

In:

Out:

Heilongjiang Lava Spring

In:

Out:

Liaoning FC

In:

Out:

Meizhou Hakka

In:

Out:

Meizhou Meixian Techand

In:

Out:

Nei Mongol Zhongyou

In:

Out:

Qingdao Huanghai

In:

Out:

Shanghai Shenxin

In:

Out:

Shenzhen F.C.

In:

Out:

Shijiazhuang Ever Bright

In:

Out:

Wuhan Zall

In:

Out:

Xinjiang Tianshan Leopard

In:

Out:

Yanbian Funde

In:

Out:

Zhejiang Greentown

In:

Out:

Zhejiang Yiteng

In:

Out:

League Two

North League

Baoding Yingli ETS

In:

Out:

Baotou Nanjiao

In:

Out:

Beijing BIT

In:

Out:

Dalian Boyoung

In:

Out:

Hebei Elite

In:

Out:

Jiangsu Yancheng Dingli

In:

Out:

Jilin Baijia

In:

Out:

Qingdao Jonoon

In:

Out:

Shaanxi Chang'an Athletic

In:

Out:

Shenyang Urban

In:

Out:

Yanbian Beiguo

In:

Out:

Yinchuan Helanshan

In:

Out:

Zibo Sunday

In:

Out:

South League

Fujian Tianxin

In:

Out:

Hainan Boying

In:

Out:

Hunan Billows

In:

Out:

Jiangxi Liansheng

In:

Out:

Nantong Zhiyun

In:

Out:

Shanghai Sunfun

In:

Out:

Shenzhen Pengcheng

In:

Out:

Shenzhen Ledman

In:

Out:

Sichuan Jiuniu

In:

Out:

Sichuan Longfor

In:

Out:

Suzhou Dongwu

In:

Out:

Yunnan Flying Tigers

In:

Out:

Zhenjiang Huasa

In:

Out:

Dissolved

Anhui Hefei Guiguan

In:

Out:

Shenyang Dongjin

In:

Out:

References

2018
2018 in Chinese football
China